Palilula is one of five city municipalities which constitute the city of Niš. It has a population of 73,801 inhabitants. It was formed on 6 June 2002.

Geography
The municipality borders Crveni Krst and Medijana municipalities in the north, Niška Banja municipality in the east, Gadžin Han and Doljevac municipalities in the south, and Merošina municipality in the south-west.

Demographics
According to the 2011 census, the municipality had a population of 73,801 inhabitants, with 54,597 in the eponymous settlement.

Settlements 
The municipality consists of 16 settlements, all of which are classified as rural, except for Palilula, which is a part of a larger urban settlement of Niš.

Neighborhoods
Neighborhoods of Palilula include:
    
 Palilula
 Staro Groblje
 Crni put
 Bubanj
 Ledena Stena
 Delijski Vis
 Apelovac
 Kovanluk
 Tutunović Podrum
 Kalac Brdo
 Suvi Do

See also
 Subdivisions of Serbia
 Niš

References

External links

 Gradska Opština Palilula

Municipalities of Niš